Beyond the Notes is a studio album by former Deep Purple keyboard player Jon Lord, released in 2004. It features guest appearances from Frida Lyngstad, Sam Brown, Miller Anderson, Thijs van Leer, Pete York, and Trondheim Soloists.

Track listing
 "Miles Away" (7:40)
 "De Profundis" (7:20)
 "One from the Meadow" (8:14)
 "Cologne Again" (6:45)
 "I'll Send You a Postcard (Pavane for Tony)" (6:54)
 "The Sun Will Shine Again" (4:22)
 "A Smile When I Shook His Hand (In Memoriam George Harrison)" (7:30)
 "November Calls" (5:03)
 "The Telemann Experiment" (7:07)
 "Music for Miriam (Version for String Orchestra)" (8:02)

All songs composed by Jon Lord. All lyrics by Sam Brown, except "November Calls" by Jon Lord

Personnel
Jon Lord - Piano, organ, keyboards
Thijs van Leer - Flute
Michael Heupel - Flute
Paul Shigihara - Guitar
Urs Fuchs - Bass guitar
 - Percussion, drums, backing vocals
Matthias Krauss - Keyboards
Gerhard Vetter - Oboe
Andy Miles - Clarinet
Pete York - Drums
Emilia Amper - Nyckel harpe
Sam Brown - Vocals ("One From The Meadow")
Miller Anderson - Vocals ("November Calls")
Frida - Vocals ("The Sun Will Shine Again")
Sabine van Baaren - Backing vocals
The Vocaleros - Voices
Cologne String Ensemble Albert Jung
Trondheim Soloists

Production notes
Produced by Mario Argandoña and Jon Lord
Recorded and mixed at Hansa Haus-Studios, Bonn, Germany, June 14 - July 31, 2004
Recordings engineered, overseen, mixed and mastered by Klaus Genuit
"Miles Away" recordings engineered by Frank Meyer
Additional recordings engineered by Manfred Zmarsly at Hansa Haus-Studios, and Mario Argandoña at Mo-Songs Studio, Cologne
Strings on "The Sun Will Shine Again" recorded at Studio N, Cologne, Germany, sessions engineered by Gunter Kasper

References

2004 albums
Jon Lord albums